Lague Airport  is an airstrip serving Akana, Republic of the Congo.

References